3 Piscis Austrini, also known as HD 201901, is a suspected astrometric binary star system that, despite its Flamsteed designation, is actually located in the constellation Microscopium. It is visible to the naked eye as a faint, orange-hued star with an apparent visual magnitude of 5.41. The system is moving closer to the Earth with a heliocentric radial velocity of −46 km/s.

The visible component is an evolved giant star with a stellar classification of K3 III. It is radiating 174 times the luminosity of the Sun from its enlarged photosphere at an effective temperature of 4,050 K.

References

K-type giants
Astrometric binaries
Microscopium
Durchmusterung objects
Piscis Austrini, 03
201901
104750
8110